Cambrian Series 2 is the unnamed 2nd series of the Cambrian. It lies above the Terreneuvian series and below the Miaolingian. Series 2 has not been formally defined by the International Commission on Stratigraphy, lacking a precise lower boundary and subdivision into stages. The proposed lower boundary is the first appearance of trilobites which is estimated to be around  million years ago.

Naming
The International Commission on Stratigraphy has not named the 2nd series of the Cambrian yet. In part the new name will replace the older terms "Lower Cambrian" and "Early Cambrian". The nomenclature used in Siberia uses the term "Yakutian" for this series.

Subdivisions
The 2nd series is currently subdivided by the ICS into two stages: Cambrian Stage 3 and Cambrian Stage 4. Both of these stages also lack formal definition. The Siberian nomenclature distinguishes three stages (lowest first): Atdabanian, Botomian and Toyonian. In general most subdivisions of this series rely on biostratigraphy of trilobite zones.

Biostratigraphy
The beginning of the 2nd series of the Cambrian is marked by the appearance of trilobites. Correlating this event on different continents has proven difficult and resolving this is essential for the definition of the lower boundary of this series. Currently the oldest trilobite known is Lemdadella which marks the beginning of the Fallotaspis zone.

The end of the 2nd series of the Cambrian is marked by the first major biotic extinction of the Paleozoic. Changes in ocean chemistry and the marine environment are posited as the most likely cause of these extinctions.

References

 
02
Geological epochs